Michel d'Oultremont (born 8 January 1992) is a Belgian nature photographer. Michel d'Oultremont is a former student of INRACI in Brussels.

Awards 
 2014 : Fritz Polking Award
 2014 : Rising Star Award of the Wildlife Photographer Of The Year
 2018 : Rising Star Award of the Wildlife Photographer Of The Year

Publications 
 Hokkaido, auto-edited, 2019
 Yellowstone, auto-edited
 Rencontres, Escourbiac,

References 

Belgian photographers
Nature photographers
1992 births
Living people